John William Hofford (May 25, 1863 – December 16, 1915) was an American professional baseball player who was a pitcher in the major leagues for the 1885–86 Pittsburgh Alleghenys. He played minor league baseball until 1896.

External links

1863 births
1915 deaths
19th-century baseball players
Major League Baseball pitchers
Pittsburgh Alleghenys players
Augusta Browns players
Rochester Flour Cities players
Utica Pent Ups players
Kansas City Cowboys (minor league) players
Memphis Grays players
San Antonio Missionaries players
San Antonio Cowboys players
Fort Worth Panthers players
Lynchburg Hill Climbers players
Brockton Shoemakers players
Torrington Tornadoes players
Macon Central City players
Littlestown (minor league baseball) players
Baseball players from Philadelphia